Daisurami Bonne Rousseau (born 9 March 1988) is a Cuban track and field sprint athlete who specialises in the 400 metres. A two-time participant at the World Championships in Athletics (2009 and 2011), her personal best for the event is 51.69 seconds. At the 2011 Pan American Games, she was the 400 m silver medallist and a relay gold medallist. She has also won medals at the Central American and Caribbean Championships in Athletics.

Born in Guantánamo and raised in Villa Clara Province, she is the daughter of Idalmis Bonne, who was also a sprinter and Pan American Games gold medallist. Her first international appearance came at the 2008 Central American and Caribbean Championships. Although she was knocked out in the early rounds of the 200 metres, she teamed up with Aymeé Martínez, Diosmely Peña and Indira Terrero to win the gold medal in the 4×400 metres relay. Further success came in 2009: she won the 400 m silver medal and relay gold at the 2009 ALBA Games and ran under 52 seconds for the first time at the Barrientos Memorial (where she came second with a time of 51.81 sec). An individual bronze and another relay win came at the 2009 Central American and Caribbean Championships in Athletics in Havana and the team's winning time of 3:29.94 minutes enabled them to compete at the 2009 World Championships in Athletics. Bonne helped the Cubans to qualify for the final as the fastest losers with a time of 3:27.36 minutes, but the squad were almost ten seconds slower in the relay final and finished last by some distance.

With no major championships to prepare for, Bonne largely competed in Cuba in 2010 and won 400 m races at the Barrientos meet and the Olimpiada del Deporte Cubano. Her sole outing abroad that year was in San Fernando in Spain at the 2010 Ibero-American Championships in Athletics. This marked the peak of her season as she had her year's best run of 52.25 seconds to win the 400 m title before going on to anchor the Cuba relay team to a second gold medal. Her 2011 season began with a win at the Copa Cuba and later that year she ran a time of 52.04 seconds for the silver at the 2011 ALBA Games (where she also won a relay gold). She returned again to the global stage at the 2011 World Championships in Athletics and was eliminated in the heats of both the individual and relay events.

She achieved a personal best at the 2011 Pan American Games in Guadalajara in October – her time of 51.69 seconds was enough for the silver medal behind Jennifer Padilla. Bonne then anchored the 4 × 400 m Cuban relay team to the gold medal.

Personal bests
200 m: 23.65 s (wind: 0.0 m/s) –  La Habana, 21 June 2014
400 m: 51.69 s A –  Guadalajara, 26 October 2011

Achievements

References

External links

Tilastopaja biography

Living people
1988 births
Sportspeople from Guantánamo
Cuban female sprinters
Athletes (track and field) at the 2011 Pan American Games
Athletes (track and field) at the 2012 Summer Olympics
Athletes (track and field) at the 2016 Summer Olympics
Olympic athletes of Cuba
Pan American Games gold medalists for Cuba
Pan American Games silver medalists for Cuba
Pan American Games medalists in athletics (track and field)
Central American and Caribbean Games gold medalists for Cuba
Central American and Caribbean Games silver medalists for Cuba
Competitors at the 2014 Central American and Caribbean Games
Central American and Caribbean Games medalists in athletics
Medalists at the 2011 Pan American Games
Olympic female sprinters
20th-century Cuban women
20th-century Cuban people
21st-century Cuban women